Stylidium section Andersonia is a taxonomic rank under Stylidium subgenus Andersonia. In 2000, A.R. Bean published a taxonomic revision of subgenus Andersonia and placed species within sections in the subgenus Andersonia, thus creating this autonym section. It contains 13 species. It is distinguished from the other sections in the subgenus by the inflorescences arising from leafless scapes, emerging from a basal or cauline cluster of broad leaves. The species in this section represent distributions from Southeast Asia, Malesia, tropical Australia, southern Queensland, and northern New South Wales.

See also
 List of Stylidium species

References

Stylidium
Plant sections